Andrew Moloney is an Australian professional boxer who held the WBA (Regular) super-flyweight title in 2020, having previously held the interim title since 2019. At regional level he held the WBA Oceania bantamweight title from 2016 to 2017 and the Commonwealth super-flyweight title in 2017. As an amateur, he won a gold medal at the 2014 Commonwealth Games in the flyweight division. As of June 2020, he is ranked as the world’s seventh best active super-flyweight by The Ring magazine, eighth by the Transnational Boxing Rankings Board and ninth by BoxRec.

Amateur career
Moloney represented Australia at two Commonwealth Games in 2010 and 2014.

Moloney also competed in the 2009 World Amateur Boxing Championships, the 2011 World Amateur Boxing Championships, and the 2013 AIBA World Boxing Championships.

In his amateur career, Moloney has won 7 state and 7 national titles.

2014 Commonwealth Games
Moloney qualified for the 2014 Commonwealth Games after claiming the Australian national amateur flyweight title.

He progressed through the preliminary bouts with a unanimous 3-0 win over Waisu Taiwo (Nigeria), before facing Northern Ireland's Ruairi Dalton in the quarterfinal stage, where he again progressed with a 3-0 decision.

Moloney then faced the hometown favourite Reece McFadden of Scotland, where Moloney adopted a patient gameplan to upset the Scot 2-1 on the judge's scorecards to progress through to the final.

The gold medal bout, staged at the SEC Armadillo, was contested with Pakistan's Muhammad Waseem. Moloney scored a unanimous 3-0 decision to claim the gold medal.

Professional career
Following his success at the 2014 Commonwealth Games, Moloney turned professional in October 2014. In 2018, Moloney fought former titlist Luis Concepción, who was ranked #5 by the WBA and #15 WBC at the time, and beat him via tenth-round stoppage.

On 16 May 2019, legendary boxing promoter Bob Arum announced that Top Rank had signed both Andrew and his twin brother Jason as a part of their stable.

On 15 November 2019, Moloney, ranked #1 by the WBA at the time, challenged WBA #5 Elton Dharry for the vacant WBA interim super-flyweight title and came out victorious via eighth-round TKO. After Román González won his fight against Kal Yafai, originally set for the WBA (Regular) super-flyweight title, González was subsequently elevated to WBA (Super) champion, which left the space for Moloney to be elevated to the new WBA (Regular) super-flyweight champion.

Personal life
Andrew is a twin brother to Jason Moloney, who is also a professional boxer.

Professional boxing record

See also
Boxing at the 2014 Commonwealth Games - Flyweight

References

External links
 
 
Moloney Twins Official Website
Andrew Moloney - Profile, News Archive & Current Rankings at Box.Live

Date of birth missing (living people)
Year of birth missing (living people)
Living people
Flyweight boxers
Boxers at the 2010 Commonwealth Games
Boxers at the 2014 Commonwealth Games
Commonwealth Games gold medallists for Australia
Boxers from Melbourne
Australian male boxers
Commonwealth Games medallists in boxing
World Boxing Association champions
World super-flyweight boxing champions
Twin sportspeople
Australian twins
Medallists at the 2014 Commonwealth Games